Chrysler's L platform was used in a family of compact automobiles produced from 1978 to 1990.  Loosely based on the Simca 1100 platform developed with Chrysler backing in Europe in the 1960s, the Chrysler L-body was the first domestically made car with transverse front wheel drive using a unibody chassis. It was created in response to the energy crisis of the 1970s and the desire to save internal costs by consolidating Chrysler's American and European operations. It was sold in North America in several lines of similar Dodge and Plymouth vehicles and discontinued when the Chrysler K platform was more successful.

 Dodge
 1978-1990 Omni
 1979-1982 Omni 024
 1982-1984 Rampage
 1983-1987 Charger
 Plymouth
 1978-1990 Horizon
 1979-1982 Horizon TC3
 1983 Scamp
 1983-1987 Turismo
 Chrysler Europe/Talbot
 1967-1985 Simca 1100
 1977-1984 Matra Rancho
 1977-1979 Chrysler-Simca Horizon
 1979-1987 Talbot Horizon

See also
 List of Chrysler platforms

L